Constitutional Assembly elections were held on 24 May 1964. The Movement of National Liberation and the Revolutionary Party both won ten seats, although sixty members were appointed by the military government (and formed the Institutional Democratic Party in September).

Results

References

Bibliography
Villagrán Kramer, Francisco. Biografía política de Guatemala: años de guerra y años de paz. FLACSO-Guatemala, 2004. 
Political handbook and Atlas of the world 1964. New York, 1965. 
Elections in the Americas A Data Handbook Volume 1. North America, Central America, and the Caribbean. Edited by Dieter Nohlen. 2005. 

Elections in Guatemala
Guatemala
1964 in Guatemala
Election and referendum articles with incomplete results